The Saxon Class Vs were German, six-coupled, goods train, tender locomotives operated by the Royal Saxon State Railways.

They were the predecessors of the Saxon Class V V. Between 1859 and 1887 they were delivered in three batches of 24, 31 and 118 engines. They had an overhanging outer firebox and a steam dome. They had different types of valve gear; Allan, Gooch and Stephenson valve gear all being used at different stages. The first batch had Dampfschlitten brakes, the second steam-operated brake blocks and the third had Westinghouse compressed-air brakes.

The Deutsche Reichsbahn took over 11 machines, which were given the numbers 53 8201 to 53 8211, and all were withdrawn from services by 1927.

See also
Royal Saxon State Railways
List of Saxon locomotives and railbuses
Narrow gauge railways in Saxony

Notes

References

Further reading

 

 

0-6-0 locomotives
05
Railway locomotives introduced in 1859
Freight locomotives